David Warren Turner (born 1927) is a physical chemist known for the development of ultra-violet photoelectron spectroscopy (UPS), a technique for the measurement of molecular orbital energies in gas-phase molecules.

His first paper on photoelectron spectroscopy was published in 1962 when he worked at Imperial College in London. In 1967 he moved to Oxford University to continue his research in Oxford's Physical Chemistry Laboratory as Fellow and Tutor at Balliol College, where he spent the rest of his career.

He was elected a Fellow of the Royal Society in 1973.

References

External links
The (Oxford) Physical & Theoretical Chemistry Laboratory - The First Sixty Years (Contents on left - click on Photoelelectron Spectroscopy)
Interview: Dr. Christopher R. Brundle (student of David Turner) with recollection of the development of the first photoelectron spectrometer.

1927 births
Living people
British physical chemists
Fellows of Balliol College, Oxford
Fellows of the Royal Society